K-181 is a  north–south state highway which runs through several counties in the north central part of the U.S. state of Kansas. K-181's southern terminus is at K-232 southeast of Lucas by Wilson Lake Dam, and the northern terminus is at U.S. Highway 36 (US-36) and US-281 south of Lebanon. Along the way the highway intersects US-24 and K-9 in Downs.

Before state highways were numbered in Kansas, the section of K-181 from the Solomon River north to Downs was part of the Roosevelt National Highway and Kansas White Way auto trails. A short section from Sylvan Grove southward was part of the Sunflower Trail. When K-181 was first designated on January 7, 1937, it extended from US-24 northward to US-36 and US-281. Then between 1948 and 1972, it was gradually extended southward to its current alignment.

Route description
K-181 begins at K-232 (Post Rock Scenic Byway) near the Wilson Lake Dam just west of the Lincoln–Russell county line. The roadway then levels out entering rural farmlands and travels roughly  before turning north. K-181 continues north, and after  crosses West Twin Creek, and then the Saline River. Shortly after crossing the Saline River the highway enters the city of Sylvan Grove becoming South Main Street and passes the Lincoln County-Sylvan Grove Fair Grounds. About halfway through Sylvan Grove it intersects 1st Street and becomes North Main Street. After exiting Sylvan Grove K-181 continues north for a short distance, and then intersects K-18. From K-18, the highway continues north for approximately  then crosses the South Branch Spillman Creek and then the North Branch Spillman Creek. K-181 enters Hunter as Main Street, crosses the Kansas and Oklahoma Railroad, then turns west at 1st Street, crosses the railroad again and then exits Hunter.

From Hunter K-181 continues west through rural farmlands then turns north at 110 Road. The highway continues north for roughly  then turns west onto Buffalo Street on the south side of the city of Tipton. The highway leaves Tipton as West 160th Drive and continues west for a short distance, and then crosses into Osborne County. K-181 continues north as Levy Road for about  where it crosses the North Fork Solomon River. After crossing the river Levy Road turns east, and K-181 continues north and enters the city of Downs as Morgan Avenue. The roadway continues through Downs to the north side where it intersects US-24 and K-9, which is known as West 40th Drive. K-181 continues north as US-281 north.

The Kansas Department of Transportation (KDOT) tracks the traffic levels on its highways, and in 2017, they determined that on average the traffic varied from 200 vehicles southwest of Sylvan Grove to 825 vehicles just north of the US-24 and K-9 intersection. K-181 is not included in the National Highway System, a system of highways important to the nation's defense, economy, and mobility. K-181 does connect to the National Highway System at its junction with US-24 and K-9, and at the intersection with US-36 and US-281.

History

Early roads and designation
Before state highways were numbered in Kansas there were Auto trails, which were an informal network of marked routes that existed in the United States and Canada in the early part of the 20th century. The section of K-181 from the Solomon River north to Downs was part of the Roosevelt National Highway and Kansas White Way auto trails. A short section from Sylvan Grove southward was part of the Sunflower Trail. US-36 was part of the Pikes Peak Ocean to Ocean Highway and K-18 was part of the Blue Line auto trail. K-181 was first designated a state highway by KDOT, at the time State Highway Commission of Kansas, on January 7, 1937. When it was first designated it originally ran from US-24 in Downs northward and ended at US-36 and US-281 south of Lebanon.

Extensions and realignments
In separate State Highway Commission meetings in 1946, resolutions were adopted to extend K-181 from Downs south then east to the Osborne–Mitchell county line and then from that point east to Tipton then south past the Mitchell–Lincoln County line to K-18 as soon as Osborne, Mitchell and Lincoln Counties had finished required projects to bring the road up to state highway standards. By mid-1948, Osborne County had finished required projects, including improvements to the North Solomon River bridge, and the highway was officially extended from Downs to the Mitchell County line on October 13, 1948. Then by mid-1950, Mitchell County had completed required projects on the section from Osborne–Mitchell County line to Tipton, and that section became K-181 on August 10, 1950. Then by early 1952, Mitchell County had completed required projects on the section from Tipton south to the Lincoln County line, and that section became K-181 on March 26, 1952. Then by mid-1954, Lincoln County had completed required projects on the remaining section from the Mitchell–Lincoln County line south to K-18 in Sylvan Grove, and that section became K-181 on May 12, 1954.

In 1964, K-181 was extended from K-18 southward to the north end of the Saline River bridge. In 1972, it was extended from the Saline River bridge further southward then eastward  to end at K-232. In 1991, K-181 was realigned slightly where the roadway crosses the South Branch Spillman Creek.

Major intersections

References

External links

Kansas Department of Transportation State Map
KDOT: Historic State Maps

181
Transportation in Russell County, Kansas
Transportation in Lincoln County, Kansas
Transportation in Mitchell County, Kansas
Transportation in Osborne County, Kansas
Transportation in Smith County, Kansas